Distribution Center Management System (DCMS) is a user friendly Warehouse Management System (WMS), designed to track the activities performed in a distribution center (DC)/warehouse. It is created and owned by a private company called Eclipse Systems Pvt Ltd. It automates the entire process flow of receiving, managing and shipping goods to customers from the warehouse. DCMS solutions are designed for both large and small scale businesses. In January 2015, the product went open source.

DCMS helps warehouses to remove the risk of stock pile-up, stock outs, pending orders and loss of sales due to customer dissatisfaction. It dramatically improves the warehouse productivity and increase inventory accuracy to 99.8%.

It helps strengthening customer relationships, reduce operating expenses and increase warehouse and distribution efficiencies. Due to its modular design, DCMS can be easily customized for various clients as per their requirements. WMS is an intelligent investment that will instantly boost accuracy in the warehouse operations and yields long term financial benefits.

DCMS modules
A typical list of modules for DCMS can be as follows:

 receiving
 putaway
 order processing
 replenishment
 pulling
 restocking
 picking
 validation
 sorting
 shipping

Features of a DCMS also has the following:

 crate management
 supervisory control
 reports

Benefits
An effective DCMS helps to prevent stock outs, stock pile-ups, pending orders and loss of sales due to customer dissatisfaction. It improves the warehouse productivity and increases inventory accuracy too. Some other benefits include reducing operating expenses and improvement in efficiencies.

Radio Frequency and Paper based Solution
DCMS works in both Radio Frequency (RF) as well as paper based environment. DCMS is a future ready solution. Warehouses which do not wish to make heavy investments in RF immediately, have the option of choosing paper based environment first, and can later adopt RF technology with minimal time and effort.

Third Party Integration
DCMS provides an open interface and can be easily integrated with third party software applications. It reduces unnecessary paper work and office routines. Having DCMS in place means warehouses do not need to depend on someone’s experience any more.

DCMS Vs Warehouse Module of Enterprise Resource Planning
Inventory initiative in recent times such as JIT (Just In Time), ECR (Efficient Customer Response) and QR (Quick Response) have turned traditional inventory management users to WMS application users. Not only this, more and more Enterprise Resource Planning (ERP) users are replacing their existing warehouse module of ERP with WMS because of its functionality fit, knowledgebase, latest up gradations, integration, adaptation to ever changing customer requirement which the ERP warehouse module cannot provide.

System Architecture
DCMS is based on Microsoft Technology with an Oracle as Database. It uses web based three tier architecture that provides a standard suite of warehousing applications. DCMS can also be installed on cloud and used as SAAS. DCMS provides rich source of WEB based reports that can be used by all levels of organizations for making important decisions.

Future ready solution
Think of a warehouse problem, DCMS will have comprehensive solution for that. Not only this, it is also ready for all future possibilities for which the warehouse may not be prepared in the current scenario. Eclipse System's rich knowledge base and R&D department keeps the application up to date to provide the latest industry features.

References

External links
 Warehousing and Distribution Center Management: The cross-dock revolution—are you in or out? https://web.archive.org/web/20100330142749/http://www.logisticsmgmt.com/article/334526-Warehousing_and_Distribution_Center_Management_The_cross_dock_revolution_are_you_in_or_out_.php

See also
 Distribution center
 Warehouse management system
 Enterprise resource planning
 Manufacturing resource planning
 Shipping list
 Pick and pack
 Cycle count
 Voice-directed warehousing
 Automated storage and retrieval system
 Wave picking
 warehouse

Business software
Warehouses